The 2010 Ball State Cardinals football team represented Ball State University during the 2010 NCAA Division I FBS football season. The Cardinals, led by second-year head coach Stan Parrish, competed in the West Division of the Mid-American Conference and played their home games at Scheumann Stadium. They finished their season 4–8, 3–5 in conference play. Parrish was fired at the end of the season.

Schedule

References

Ball State
Ball State Cardinals football seasons
Ball State Cardinals football